Saffron Jordan (born 27 November 1993) is an English professional footballer who plays as a forward for Blackburn Rovers.

Club career 
Jordan signed for Blackburn in 2014. In July 2020 she signed a new one-year contract extension.

Jordan is the Blackburn Rovers captain.

Personal life 
Jordan has a dual-career and alongside football, works for the NHS.

Throughout the COVID-19 pandemic, Saffron Jordan worked as a member of the critical care ward throughout, whilst continuing a career in football.

Awards 
Jordan was selected in the Her Football Hub team of the month for October 2021.

References 

Living people
1993 births
English women's footballers
Women's association football forwards
Blackburn Rovers L.F.C. players
Saint Leo University alumni
College women's soccer players in the United States